Rachel Wammack is a country music singer/songwriter signed to RCA Records from Muscle Shoals, Alabama. In 2018, she released her first self-titled EP.

Career 
Wammack is from Muscle Shoals, Alabama. She wrote her first song when she was 12 and by 17 was discovered by Sony. Before she began her recording career, she attended the University of North Alabama where she was crowned Miss UNA 2015. Six months after she finished school she signed with Sony and moved to Nashville.

Her first self-titled EP was produced by Dann Huff and was released on April 6, 2018. 
Rolling Stone magazine listed Wammack as one of  “10 new Country artists you need to know.”  Her single "My Boyfriend Doesn't Speak For Me Anymore" was also featured on Rolling Stone and was described as "mixing the power-pop pipes of Adele with the women-first attitude of Loretta Lynn." The EP also features her first single, "Damage", which was co-written with Tom Douglas and David Hodges.

On March 15, 2019, she released her single "Enough." Her next single, "Something People Say (Acoustic)", was released on June 6, 2019.

After a two-year hiatus from social media, Wammack released her single "Like Me" on August 12, 2022. Wammack has described "Like Me" as "a love note to me and a reminder to the world [...] I'm not everybody's cup of tea and that's OK. That was a hard thing for me to reckon with. But now, I feel like people are more drawn to me now that I like myself."

Personal life 
Rachel Wammack was born on June 28, 1994. She was raised in Muscle Shoals, Alabama and attended Muscle Shoals High School, where she performed in the school's marching band and percussion ensemble. Wammack attended the University of North Alabama and was crowned Miss UNA 2015. On August 3, 2019, she married Noah Purcell.

Discography

Extended plays

References

External links
 

American country singer-songwriters
American women country singers
RCA Records artists
Living people
Country musicians from Alabama
Singer-songwriters from Alabama
1994 births